, known in PAL regions as Tank Battles, is an artillery/strategy game for the Nintendo DS that was developed by Milestone Inc.

Overview
In Tank Beat players take control of Vill Katjue, a rookie tank driver lost in the chaos of an invasion. The game features 24 missions as well as skirmish modes.

The game is played with the stylus, with players drawing paths on the touch screen for their tank to follow, dragging the stylus across the screen to rotate the camera, and tapping on enemy units to fire upon them. More than 20 different tanks and combat vehicles such as APCs or missile launchers are available to the player, each differing in speed, defense, firepower, and weapons. Players can also give commands to allied AI-controlled tanks.

The game also supports two to four-player wireless play, and online games through the Nintendo Wi-Fi Connection.

Reception
Tank Beat received generally negative or mixed reviews. The gameplay mechanics have been cited to have a "hit or miss" feel, ranging from "great fun" to "old in about two seconds". GameRankings, a review aggregator site, currently rates Tank Beat at 53%.

Sequel
A sequel titled Tank Beat 2 Gekitotsu! Deutsch-gun vs. Rengou-gun was released in Japan on November 29, 2007. It was released in North America on December 2, 2008 renamed Heavy Armor Brigade and published by UFO Interactive.

References

External links
O3 Entertainment English Website
Milestone Inc. Website (in Japanese)

2006 video games
Nintendo DS games
Nintendo DS-only games
Nintendo Wi-Fi Connection games
Multiplayer and single-player video games
Strategy video games
Tank simulation video games
Video games developed in Japan
MileStone Inc. games